Hoàng Thanh Tùng (born 19 November 1996) is a Vietnamese footballer who plays as a winger for V.League 2 club Công An Nhân Dân.

Honours

Club
Công An Nhân Dân
V.League 2: 2022

International
Vietnam U19
AFF U-19 Youth Championship
 Runners-up :  : 2013, 2014
Hassanal Bolkiah Trophy
 Runners-up :  : 2014
Vietnam U21
International U-21 Thanh Niên Newspaper Cup
 Runners-up :  : 2017

International career

U-19

U-22

References 

1996 births
Living people
Vietnamese footballers
Association football wingers
V.League 1 players
Hoang Anh Gia Lai FC players
Vietnam international footballers
People from Thanh Hóa province